Ututo is a Linux distribution consisting entirely of free software. The distribution is named for a variety of gecko found in northern Argentina.

Ututo was the first fully free Linux-based system recognized by the GNU Project. The founder of the GNU Project, Richard Stallman, formerly endorsed the distribution nearly exclusively, and used it on his personal computer, before he switched to gNewSense, and later Trisquel.

History
Ututo was first released in 2000 by Diego Saravia in National University of Salta. Argentina. It was one of the first live CD distributions in the world and the first Linux distribution in Argentina. Ututo carried Simusol, a system to simulate Solar Energy projects. Ututo was simple to install, because it did not need any configuration. It automatically detected the hardware in the machine, it only asked to "move your mouse". At that time no other distribution worked that way.

In 2002, Ututo-R was created, which offered the possibility of operating like a software router. This version was created by Marcos Zapata and used in Buenos Aires public schools.

In 2004, the Ututo-e project was born, swiftly becoming the most important derivative of Ututo. This project was started by Daniel Olivera.

In 2006, Ututo was declared "of National Interest" by the Argentine Chamber of Deputies.

Ututo XS
Ututo XS is the current stable version of Ututo.

Ututo XS is compiled using Gentoo Linux ebuilds and emerge software. All documentation is in Spanish.

With the emergence of the XS series, many new features were added, including a faster system installer. Pablo Manuel Rizzo designed the package management system, Ututo-Get, modelled after Debian's APT; however, as other Gentoo-based distros, Ututo is compatible with Portage.

Ututo has different binaries optimized for different Intel and AMD processors .

With no releases since 2012 the distribution is considered "dormant".

Ututo UL
Ututo UL (or Ubuntu-Libre) is the current developed version of Ututo. Ututo UL utilize Ubuntu as the distro base, with all non-free software removed as usual in the Ututo project, and Linux-libre as the kernel.

In 2017 the original idea of distributing Simusol, a system to simulate Solar Energy projects, returned to the heart of the project.

Reception 
Tux Machines reviewed Ututo in 2006:

See also

 Comparison of Linux distributions
 GNU/Linux naming controversy
 List of Linux distributions based on Gentoo
 List of 3rd-party Linux distributions based on Ubuntu

References

External links

 
 A review of Ututo-e by Linux.com
 Richard Stallman talking about Ututo
 

2000 software
Free software only Linux distributions
Gentoo Linux derivatives
X86-64 Linux distributions
Linux distributions